Players and pairs who neither have high enough rankings nor receive wild cards may participate in a qualifying tournament held one week before the annual Wimbledon Tennis Championships.

Seeds

  Darija Jurak /  Katalin Marosi (qualified)
  Karolína Plíšková /  Kristýna Plíšková (qualifying competition)
  Lindsay Lee-Waters /  Megan Moulton-Levy (qualified)
  Vesna Dolonc /  Olga Savchuk (qualified)
  Shuko Aoyama /  Maria Kondratieva (qualifying competition)
  Sandra Klemenschits /  Tatjana Malek (first round)
  Mariana Duque Mariño /  Edina Gallovits-Hall (first round)
  Lara Arruabarrena /  Karin Knapp (first round)

Qualifiers

  Darija Jurak /  Katalin Marosi
  Mirjana Lučić /  Valeria Savinykh
  Lindsay Lee-Waters /  Megan Moulton-Levy
  Vesna Dolonc /  Olga Savchuk

Qualifying draw

First qualifier

Second qualifier

Third qualifier

Fourth qualifier

External links
 
 2012 Wimbledon Championships on WTAtennis.com
2012 Wimbledon Championships – Women's draws and results at the International Tennis Federation

Women's Doubles Qualifying
Wimbledon Championship by year – Women's doubles qualifying
Wimbledon Championships